Franklin John Trehern Mitchell (December 27, 1925 – September 15, 2021) was a plasterer and political figure in British Columbia. He represented Esquimalt from 1951 to 1952 as a Co-operative Commonwealth Federation (CCF) member and Esquimalt-Port Renfrew from 1979 to 1986 as a New Democratic Party member in the Legislative Assembly of British Columbia.

After completing high school, Mitchell joined the Canadian Merchant Navy. He served in the infantry and paratroop division of the Canadian Army during World War II.

Mitchell was reelected in 1952 but then defeated when he ran for reelection to the assembly in 1953 and 1975.

1956, Mitchell became a police officer with the Esquimalt Police Department.

References 

1925 births
2021 deaths
British Columbia Co-operative Commonwealth Federation MLAs
20th-century Canadian politicians
British Columbia New Democratic Party MLAs
Canadian police officers
Canadian military personnel of World War II
Politicians from Victoria, British Columbia